Ray Smith is an American businessman, who founded BE-AT.TV in 2009.

Early life and education 
Smith was born and raised in Drexel Hill, Pennsylvania before moving to Southern California. He graduated cum laude from the University of Southern California.

Early career 
Smith's past experience includes R.B. Webber, a leading Palo Alto-based strategy consulting firm, and the Unlisted Group, where as Principal, he focused on converging and monetizing new technology and content creation.

BE-AT.TV 
Ray Smith founded BE-AT.TV, an information and networking website for dance music events, in 2009.

References 

University of Southern California alumni
American chief executives
Living people
Year of birth missing (living people)